Live at the Village Vanguard is a 1967 big band jazz album recorded by the Thad Jones/Mel Lewis Jazz Orchestra and released on the Solid State Records label.  The album was nominated for a 1967 Grammy award in the "Best Instrumental Jazz Performance - Large Group..." category.  All tracks are also included on Mosaic's limited edition boxed set, The Complete Solid State Recordings of the Thad Jones/Mel Lewis Orchestra and seven tracks were also re-issued in the 1990s on CD as Volume 3 of LRC Ltd.'s (and Laserlight's) series Village Vanguard Live Sessions.

Track listing
LP side A:
 "The Little Pixie" – 10:34
 "A- That's Freedom" (H. Jones) – 7:01
 "Bachafillen" (Brown) – 7:08
LP side B:
 "Don't Git Sassy" – 7:22
 "Willow Tree" (Razaf, Waller) – 5:04
 "Samba Con Getchu" (Brookmeyer) – 12:17
Bonus tracks added to later Blue Note CD reissue:
 "Quietude" – 4:48
"The Second Race" – 9:37
"Lover Man" (Davis, Ramirez, Sherman) – 4:53

All songs by Thad Jones except as noted.

Personnel
 Thad Jones – flugelhorn
 Mel Lewis – drums
 Roland Hanna – piano
 Richard Davis – bass
 Sam Herman – guitar
 Jerome Richardson – alto saxophone, soprano saxophone, clarinet, flute
 Jerry Dodgion – alto saxophone, flute
 Joe Farrell – tenor saxophone, flute
 Eddie Daniels – tenor saxophone, clarinet
 Pepper Adams – baritone saxophone, clarinet
 Richard Williams – trumpet
 Bill Berry – trumpet
 Snooky Young – trumpet
 Marvin Stamm – trumpet
 Jimmy Nottingham – trumpet
 Bob Brookmeyer – trombone
 Garnett Brown – trombone
 Tom McIntosh – trombone
 Cliff Heather – trombone

References and external Links

Live at the Village Vanguard at discogs.com
 [ Allmusic]
 Solid State SS-18016
 Blue Note 60438

1967 live albums
The Thad Jones/Mel Lewis Orchestra live albums
Solid State Records (jazz label) live albums
Albums recorded at the Village Vanguard